Klyuyevka is a rural locality (a settlement) in Kabansky District, Republic of Buryatia, Russia. The population was 1,231 as of 2010. There are 18 streets.

Geography 
Klyuyevka is located 80 km southwest of Kabansk (the district's administrative centre) by road. Babushkin is the nearest rural locality.

References 

Rural localities in Kabansky District
Populated places on Lake Baikal